The Sidney Herald is an American newspaper and website based in Sidney, Montana. It has been touted as the "official newspaper of Richland County, Montana". It was founded in 1908.

References

External links
Official website

Newspapers published in Montana